Clever is a city in Christian County, Missouri, United States. The population was 2,139 at the 2010 census. It is part of the Springfield, Missouri Metropolitan Statistical Area. Clever, like the rest of Christian County, saw a significant increase in population between 2000 and 2010.

Geography
The town lies in the western panhandle of Christian County, just south of Missouri Highway 14 between Nixa and Billings. The town of Republic and the Wilson's Creek National Battlefield are approximately six miles to the north and northeast.

History
Lincoln Township and the land that would eventually become the town of Clever remained largely unsettled for many years after Missouri became a state in 1821. A U.S. Government land survey wasn't conducted until 1834, and the first land transaction wasn't registered until 1845. With the coming of more settlement to southwest Missouri also came the Old Wire Road. Following a portion of the Great Osage Trail, the road extended from St. Louis, Missouri southwest to Fort Smith, Arkansas passing through Springfield, Missouri and on through Christian county. Along with supply trains and settlers headed for Fort Smith, the Butterfield Overland Mail also made use of the road from 1858 to 1861. A telegraph line ran along the same route as well, giving rise to its name.

 Prior to Clever's existence as a town, a Civil War battle took place nearby. On August 2, 1861, the Battle of Dug Springs pitted the Union forces of General Nathaniel Lyon against the numerically superior combined Confederate forces of General Benjamin McCulloch, Arkansas State Troops under General Nicholas Bartlett Pearce, and Missouri State Guard under General (and Missouri Governor) Sterling Price. The battle, along present-day Old Wire Road, was the first time during the Missouri Campaign of 1861 that the Union "Army of the West" and Confederate forces met in conflict. Despite being outnumbered more than two to one, Lyon's Union forces prevailed in the battle. The clash is seen as a precursor to the much larger and strategically important Battle of Wilson's Creek eight days later.

Following the end of the Civil War, a road from Springfield to Billings, Missouri crossed Old Wire Road, and it was this crossroads that gave rise to Clever. Farmer Ike Teague constructed a two-story home at the crossroads around 1890. A short time later a physician, Doctor Bishop, purchased the home and constructed a building across the road with the intent of opening a drug store and mercantile. However he died unexpectedly before completion. It would sit vacant until a year later, around 1894, William Wilson purchased the building and opened the first store in the future Clever. The first post office was established in the store in 1896 with Frank Netzer—now the store's proprietor—as postmaster.

When the first choice for a post office name was rejected by the Federal government, Mr. Netzer surveyed customers and one, Tom Lentz, suggested "Clever" because the young community's residents were friendly and wise.  Growth of the small crossroads village was slow at first. A blacksmith shop, second store building, and meeting hall had been constructed by 1902 and a tomato canning factory established in 1904. 

The next year, surveyors for the Missouri Pacific Railroad laid out a route from Springfield to Crane, Missouri that passed through Clever. It was at this same time the plat for Clever was officially surveyed and laid out. A 300-foot deep well was drilled for community use and operated by a small gasoline engine until electricity came to Clever in 1928. By 1908 the growing town featured many new business spurred by the railroad including a hotel, lumber yard, photography studio, a bank, movie theater, flour mill, and several mercantile and hardware establishments. With this rapid growth residents felt it time to officially organize as a municipality and petitioned the Christian County court, which granted the request and appointed Clever's first Board of Trustees in February, 1909.

In 1910, Clever's first documented population in the United States Census was 248. Its location on the railroad meant an opportunity for entertainment not normal for a typical small town of the era. A series of Chautauqua events over the course of several summers entertained the residents, as did famed showman and Wild West figure William "Buffalo Bill" Cody in 1913. Famed ragtime composer and pianist Blind Boone also performed in concert at the Clever school gym. Through the first half of the 20th century the population remained relatively stable around or slightly below 500 residents. However between 1990 and 2000 the population nearly doubled from 580 to 1,010., and then more than doubled between 2000 and 2010 rising from 1,010 to 2,139. On May 4, 2003, a series of tornadoes passed by the outer reaches of the town. The tornado outbreak resulted in major property damage, numerous livestock deaths, and one human fatality.

Demographics

2010 census
As of the census of 2010, there were 2,139 people, 817 households, and 602 families residing in the city. The racial makeup of the city was 2028 (96.3%) White, 7 (0.3%) African American, 1.1% Native American, 0.3% from other races, and 30 (2.0%) from two or more races. Hispanic or Latino of any race were 53 (2.5%) of the population.

There were 817 households, of which 44.2% had children under the age of 18 living with them, 56.9% were married couples living together, 10.8% had a female householder with no husband present, 6.0% had a male householder with no wife present, and 26.3% were non-families. 20.9% of all households were made up of individuals, and 8.5% had someone living alone who was 65 years of age or older. The average household size was 2.62 and the average family size was 3.01.

The median age in the city was 29 years. 30.2% of residents were under the age of 18; 9.2% were between the ages of 18 and 24; 35.6% were from 25 to 44; 16.3% were from 45 to 64; and 8.7% were 65 years of age or older. The gender makeup of the city is 1034 (48.3%) male and 1105 (51.7%) female.

2000 census
As of the census of 2000, there were 1,010 people, 388 households, and 282 families residing in the city. The population density was 1,581.7 people per square mile (609.3/km2). There were 420 housing units at an average density of 657.7 per square mile (253.4/km2). The racial makeup of the city was 97.72% White, 0.30% Native American, 0.10% Asian, and 1.88% from two or more races. Hispanic or Latino of any race were 1.88% of the population.

There were 388 households, out of which 43.0% had children under the age of 18 living with them, 58.8% were married couples living together, 10.3% had a female householder with no husband present, and 27.3% were non-families. 23.5% of all households were made up of individuals, and 11.9% had someone living alone who was 65 years of age or older. The average household size was 2.60 and the average family size was 3.09.

In the city, the population was spread out, with 31.4% under the age of 18, 6.6% from 18 to 24, 35.0% from 25 to 44, 15.8% from 45 to 64, and 11.2% who were 65 years of age or older. The median age was 31 years. For every 100 females, there were 83.0 males. For every 100 females age 18 and over, there were 82.8 males.

The median income for a household in the city was $32,798, and the median income for a family was $38,500. Males had a median income of $27,955 versus $21,477 for females. The per capita income for the city was $14,958. About 3.6% of families and 6.0% of the population were below the poverty line, including 7.8% of those under age 18 and 8.2% of those age 65 or over.

City government
The City of Clever has four alderman, each elected for a two-year term on a nonpartisan basis, and a mayor also elected for a two-year term. The mayor is Dale Maisel who was first elected in June 2020. Alderman include Chris McPhil (East Ward 1), Scott Hackworth (East Ward 2), Josiah Fuller (West Ward 1), and Jeanie Priebe (West Ward 2).  Kristy Keithley serves as the City Clerk.

The city provides a small police department for public safety, which is led by Chief Jeff Lofton. Fire protection is provided for the city and surrounding rural areas by the Clever Fire Protection District, a volunteer department.

Education
The first school building in Clever was constructed in 1909. A two-room, two-story brick building, it served to educate students from a number of previous small rural one-room school houses, including the Pleasant Hope school previously one half mile north of Clever. Additions were made in 1912 and 1916 that allowed the education to go up to tenth grade. In 1919 Blooming Grove and Taylor schools merged with Clever to form the Consolidated District Number 5. In 1920 it became a four-year high school.

A fire in the Spring of 1931 destroyed the building, however, a larger two-story brick building was built in time for the following school year. Merges with several small rural districts in the mid-20th century led to the creation of the current Clever R-V (5) school district. The district now provides pre-Kindergarten through 12th grade education to the community and rural portions of Christian County. In 2010–11 school year, there were 1,119 students enrolled in the Clever R-V school district.

Notable people
Robert Mandan- actor, best known for his role as Chester Tate on the TV satire Soap.
Jim Winn- former professional baseball pitcher for the Pittsburgh Pirates.

References

External links
 Historic maps of Clever in the Sanborn Maps of Missouri Collection at the University of Missouri

Cities in Christian County, Missouri
Springfield metropolitan area, Missouri
Cities in Missouri